Mycobacterium gadium is a species of the phylum Actinomycetota (Gram-positive bacteria with high guanine and cytosine content, one of the dominant phyla of all bacteria), belonging to the genus Mycobacterium.

Description
Short gram-positive, nonmotile and acid-fast rods.

Colony characteristics
Yellow-orange, scotochromogenic colonies, but the pigmentation deepens with exposure to light. Older cultures are more dry and rough.

Physiology
Rapid growth on Löwenstein-Jensen medium at 28 °C and 37 °C, but not at 45 °C.

Pathogenesis
Pathogenicity in humans is not known. Production of a local regressing infection but no death in mice.
 Biosafety level 1

Type strain
First isolated from known tuberculous patient from Cadiz, Spain.
Strain ATCC 27726 = CCUG 37515 = CIP 105388 = DSM 44077 = HAMBI 2274 = JCM 12688 = NCTC 10942.

References

Casal,M., and J. Calero. 1974. Mycobacterium gadium sp. nov. A new species of rapid-growing scotochromogenic mycobacteria. Tubercle,  55, 299–308.]

External links
Type strain of Mycobacterium gadium at BacDive -  the Bacterial Diversity Metadatabase

Acid-fast bacilli
gadium
Bacteria described in 1974